Rumors (or rumours) are pieces of purportedly true information that circulate without substantiating evidence.

rumors, or rumours may also refer to:

Literature
 Rumors (play), a play by Neil Simon
Rumors: A Luxe Novel, a novel by Anna Godbersen

Music
Rumors (album), a 1976 album by Arrogance
Rumours (album), a 1977 album by Fleetwood Mac

 "Rumors" (Timex Social Club song), 1986
 "Rumors" (Lindsay Lohan song), 2004
 "Rumors" (Lizzo song), 2021
 "Rumors" (Gucci Mane song), 2022
 "Rumors", a 2020 song by Ava Max from Heaven & Hell
 "Rumors", a 2015 song by Adam Lambert from The Original High
 "Rumours", a 1973 song by the band Hot Chocolate

Film and television
Rumors (film), a 1943 cartoon
Rumours (TV series), a Canadian sitcom
"Rumours" (Glee), a 2011 episode of Glee
"Rumors", an episode of The Suite Life of Zack & Cody

See also
Rumor (disambiguation)